Hampton Buttes is a small range of mountains or hills in the U.S. state of Oregon. The range lies mostly in Crook County but extends south and west into Deschutes County in Central Oregon near the unincorporated community of Hampton. U.S. Route 20, an east–west highway, skirts the range to the south. The upper South Fork Crooked River flows north along the eastern base of the range.

The peak, the range, and the unincorporated community of Hampton or Hampton Station, were named for a local resident, Joe Hampton, who moved from near Eugene to this area in 1870.

The Bureau of Land Management oversees two wilderness study areas (WSA)s at Hampton Buttes. WSAs are public lands under consideration by the U.S. Congress for wilderness protection. The BLM also oversees a rockhounding area at Hampton Buttes that is known for its petrified wood.

References

Mountains of Crook County, Oregon
Buttes of Oregon
Mountains of Deschutes County, Oregon
Mountain ranges of Oregon